"Acantharctia" ansorgei is a moth of the  family Erebidae. It is found in Uganda.

Taxonomy
Although placed in the Arctiidae genus Acantharctia, this species is probably a Notodontidae species.

References

Endemic fauna of Uganda
Moths described in 1910
Spilosomina
Insects of Uganda
Moths of Africa